Hasnain Qayyum Khan (born 15 January 1975, in Lahore) is a former Pakistani cricketer who played first-class cricket from 1994 to 2000.

A right-handed batsman, Hasnain Qayyum played one Under-19 Test for Pakistan in 1993-94. He made his first-class debut for Pakistan International Airlines in the 1994-95 Patron's Trophy but, batting at various positions in the order, he scored only 135 runs in four matches and was omitted when the team reached the finals.

He was a member of the Redco Pakistan Limited team that won the non-first-class Grade II Patron's Trophy competition in 1998-99. Redco were promoted to the top level for the 1999-2000 season. They finished runners-up in the National One-day Championship that was held in September and October 1999, and when they competed in the Quaid-e-Azam Trophy, beginning in late October, Qayyum was appointed captain.

Redco won three of their 10 matches and finished in the middle of Pool B, and never competed at first-class level again, but Qayyum had a personally successful season. He scored 614 runs at an average of 51.16, with a top score of 161 not out against Rawalpindi.

He played no further first-class cricket.

References

External links
 Hasnain Qayyum at CricketArchive
 

1975 births
Living people
Pakistani cricketers
Pakistan International Airlines cricketers
Redco Pakistan Limited cricketers
Cricketers from Lahore